is a Japanese comedian and actor.

Miyagawa grew up in Ōtsu, Shiga Prefecture. He is represented with Yoshimoto Creative Agency from Yoshimoto Kogyo. Miyagawa should not be confused with Daisuke Miyagawa of the comedy duo Daisuke and Hanako Miyagawa.

Filmography

Variety series
Regular appearances

Former regular appearances

Irregular appearances

Former irregular appearances

Special programmes

Satellite programmes

Advertisements

Internet

TV drama

Films

Japanese dub

Internet drama

Direct-to-video

Books

Video games

Radio

Stage

Other

References

External links
 

Japanese male film actors
Japanese male television actors
Japanese male voice actors
Japanese male comedians
1972 births
Living people
Male actors from Kyoto
Male voice actors from Kyoto
People from Ōtsu, Shiga
Actors from Shiga Prefecture
Male voice actors from Shiga Prefecture